AIK Fotboll Damer is a Swedish women's association football club from Stockholm, currently competing in the Damallsvenskan. The team, a section of AIK, is affiliated to the Stockholms Fotbollförbund and plays in the Skytteholms IP in Solna, Stockholm.

Founded in 1970, AIK first earned promotion to the Damallsvenskan in 1992, and avoided relegation for two seasons before ending second to last in 1995. A decade passed before the team was back for the 2005 season. AIK was promptly relegated but earned its third promotion the next year. The following years marked the team's major successes yet, with AIK reaching the national Cup's final in 2007, which they lost 4–3 against Umeå IK, and ending 4th in 2008. After four years in top flight AIK was relegated in 2010 but recovered the category for the 2012 season after topping the Swedish First Division's Norrettan Group. They were relegated to the Norrettan after the 2012 season after finishing in last position. They regained promotion to the Damallsvenskan the following season.  They were relegated to the Elitettan, the Swedish second division in 2015.

Current squad

Former players
For details of current and former players, see :Category:AIK Fotboll (women) players.

Honours 
 Elitettan (Tier 2)
 Winners (1): 2020

Attendances
In recent seasons AIK Fotboll Dam have had the following average attendances:

Records 

 Victory, Stockholmsserien klass 1: 15–0 vs. KFUM Söder (14 October 1973)
 Loss, Division 1, Norra: 0–13 vs. Djurgårdens IF (7 May 1996)
 Most appearances: 378,  Marie Nyberg
 Most goals scored: 89,  Ulla-Riita Kaasinen

See also 
 AIK Fotboll

References

External links 
 AIK Fotboll Dam – Official website 

 
Women's football clubs in Sweden
Football clubs in Stockholm
1970 establishments in Sweden
Association football clubs established in 1970